Casalmoro is a comune (municipality) in the Province of Mantua in the Italian region Lombardy, located about  east of Milan and about  northwest of Mantua.

Casalmoro borders the following municipalities: Acquafredda, Asola, Castel Goffredo, Remedello.

Demographic evolution

References

External links
 www.comune.casalmoro.mn.it/

Cities and towns in Lombardy